Yoon Won-il (born October 23, 1986) is a South Korean football player who currently plays for Daejeon Citizen in the K League Challenge.

References

External links 

1986 births
Living people
South Korean footballers
Jeju United FC players
Daejeon Hana Citizen FC players
K League 1 players
K League 2 players
Association football defenders